Jolyon Toby Dennis Maugham  (born 1 July 1971) is a British barrister. A taxation law specialist, he is the founder and director of the Good Law Project, through which he has played a role in bringing to court a number of legal challenges to the Brexit process, which he opposed. He has written on Brexit and legal issues for publications such as The Daily Telegraph, The Guardian and the New Statesman.

Maugham has been at the centre of a number of controversies: a 2022 profile in The Times described him as "the Marmite of the Bar", who "rose from relative obscurity to found the Good Law Project".

Biography
Maugham is the son of the novelist David Benedictus, although they did not meet until Maugham was 17. He was brought up in New Zealand by his English mother, Lynne Joyce Maugham, and his adoptive father, Alan Barker. At 16 he had to leave his parents' house after a dispute, and did cleaning work. He went to England in 1989 and stayed with his mother's father after finishing school.

Maugham went to Wellington High School, New Zealand. He graduated with a first-class LLB in European Legal Studies from Durham University (Hatfield College) in 1995. He also spent some time in Belgium at the Katholieke Universiteit Leuven, studying under Walter Van Gerven, and later completed an MA at Birkbeck, University of London. As a student he was sent by a temping agency to carry out secretarial work at a law firm, but was sent back for being a man. Maugham sued, claiming to be a victim of sex discrimination, and was awarded compensation.

Maugham completed his pupillage in the chambers of Lord Irvine. He became a Queen's Counsel in 2015. Maugham was a tenant at Devereux Chambers, specialising in taxation law. He left Devereux Chambers at the end of 2020.

Involvement in politics

Legal challenges to Brexit
Maugham's cases include an unsuccessful case by British expatriates in Europe who objected to their loss of European Union citizenship, a case to clarify whether the Brexit process can be reversed by Parliament, and a failed legal challenge to referendum spending by Vote Leave.

Affiliations with political parties
Maugham had advised the Labour Party on tax policy under Ed Miliband. He was formerly on the advisory council of liberal conservative think tank Bright Blue, which advises the Conservative Party. The Times reported that Maugham "flirted with Labour in the run-up to the 2015 election, harbouring a fleeting fantasy of becoming attorney-general".

In April 2017, Maugham reportedly contemplated forming a new centrist political party, "Spring", and standing for election against Prime Minister Theresa May in her constituency of Maidenhead, but decided against it.

The Good Law Project
Maugham is on the Board of the Good Law Project, a not-for-profit campaign organisation that aims to use the law to protect the interests of the public.

During the COVID-19 pandemic in the United Kingdom, Maugham and the Good Law Project challenged the appointments of key figures in the British government's pandemic response, such as Kate Bingham and Baroness Harding. GLP alleged their appointments were the result of a "culture of cronyism and the highly secretive use of billions of pounds of public funds". In June 2021, the challenge against the appointment of Bingham was dropped. Bingham's work on the UK's vaccination rollout programme has been praised by scientists and international media, particularly for securing 350 million doses of six vaccines and setting up infrastructure for clinical trials, manufacturing and distribution.

In November 2021, a company which supplied face shields during the COVID-19 pandemic announced it was suing GLP for defamation after it alleged the firm had obtained its contract through political connections and had supplied substandard equipment, without evidence. The same month, Maugham had to apologize on behalf of GLP to the Health Secretary and the High Court after breaching civil procedure rules in a case concerning the supply of PPE equipment.

Transgender rights 
Maugham has been an outspoken supporter of transgender rights and as of November 2020 is representing a transgender boy in a lawsuit against the NHS over treatment delays. As of June 2021, Maugham is involved in an appeal against a decision to award charitable status to LGB Alliance on the basis that it did not "meet the threshold tests to be registered as a charity"; Maugham has spoken publicly about the charity, which he accused of being "a transphobic hate group."

Controversies

Criticism of judges 
In 2019, Maugham was criticized by many in the legal community after he accused two High Court judges, Mr Justice Swift and Mr Justice Supperstone, of being biased in favour of the government after Mr Justice Swift refused permission to Good Law Project to bring a legal challenge against Brexit.

Doxing of home address
In late 2019 Maugham accused the talkRADIO presenter Julia Hartley-Brewer of revealing his home address at a time when he was receiving death threats. He also criticised the television programme Question Time for allowing Hartley-Brewer to appear as a panellist. Hartley-Brewer defended herself by saying Maugham's address was already easily available online and that he had previously revealed it himself in published interviews.

Killing of a fox

On the morning of 26 December 2019 (Boxing Day), Maugham stated in a Twitter post that he had "killed a fox with a baseball bat" whilst wearing his wife's kimono. Maugham claimed that the fox was entrapped by the netting surrounding a hen house in his garden. The killing drew widespread condemnation and received extensive coverage, domestically and internationally. The Royal Society for the Prevention of Cruelty to Animals investigated the matter, but decided not to prosecute because a post-mortem showed the fox had been killed swiftly, meaning that "the evidential threshold needed to take a prosecution under the CPS code was not met".

In 2021, Maugham claimed he and his chambers were blacklisted by law firm Allen & Overy after he killed the fox.

Breach of court rules 
In 2021, Maugham had to apologize after Good Law Project published a witness statement before it was put into evidence, thus breaching High Court litigation rules.

Apologies for social media statements 
In 2020, Maugham had to apologize after comparing Dominic Cummings breaching COVID-19 lockdown rules to ‘a man with HIV having unprotected sex’, which was widely decried as offensive.

In 2022, Maugham was forced to apologize after falsely claiming he won a judicial review against Matt Hancock, the former Secretary of State for Health, in which he had claimed that Dido Harding and Mike Coupe were given appointments because of their "personal or political connections" to politicians. The High Court had in fact ruled that "The evidence provides no support for this at all. Baroness Harding had previous relevant experience of senior positions in large retail businesses and in the NHS. Mr Coupe had vast experience of managing complex public-facing organisations".

See also
Gina Miller
Simon Dolan

References

External links
Waiting for Tax – Maugham's blog
Jolyon Maugham | The Guardian

1971 births
Alumni of Birkbeck, University of London
Alumni of Hatfield College, Durham
English barristers
Living people
Members of the Middle Temple
People educated at Wellington High School, New Zealand
21st-century King's Counsel